Bang was Swedish feminist culture and society magazine, which was subtitled Feministisk Kulturtidskrift. It was started in 1991 by students at Stockholm University. Previous editors-in-chief included Sanna Samuelsson and Valerie Kyeyune Backström. The magazine is named after Barbro Alving, whose signature was "Bang". There were four issues per year with a circulation of 7,500. The last print issue was published in December 2019, and the magazine went on online-only format.

References

External links
 Magazine website 

1991 establishments in Sweden
2019 disestablishments in Sweden
Defunct magazines published in Sweden
Feminist magazines
Feminism in Sweden
Magazines established in 1991
Magazines disestablished in 2019
Magazines published in Stockholm
Online magazines with defunct print editions
Quarterly magazines published in Sweden
Swedish-language magazines
Student magazines
Stockholm University
Women's magazines published in Sweden